Beomil Station is a station of the Busan Metro Line 1 in Beomil-dong, Dong District, Busan, South Korea. The station is unrelated to the Beomil Station of Korail.

External links

  Cyber station information from Busan Transportation Corporation

Busan Metro stations
Dong District, Busan
Railway stations opened in 1987
1987 establishments in South Korea
20th-century architecture in South Korea